Geographically, the U.S. states known as the Old South are those in the Southern United States that were among the original Thirteen Colonies. The region term is differentiated from the Deep South and Upper South. 

From a cultural and social standpoint, the "Old South" is used to describe the rural, agriculturally-based, slavery-reliant economy and society in the Antebellum South, prior to the American Civil War (1861–65), in contrast to the "New South" of the post-Reconstruction Era.

Culture
The social structure of the Old South was made an important research topic for scholars by Ulrich Bonnell Phillips in the early 20th century.   The romanticized image of the "Old South" tells of slavery's plantations, as famously typified in Gone with the Wind, a blockbuster 1936 novel and its adaptation in a 1939 Hollywood film, along with the animated Disney film, Song of the South (1946).   

Prior to the Civil War, Southerners were never regarded as a distinctive people, separate from the rest of the nation, who possessed their own values and ways of life. During the three decades before the Civil War, popular writers created a stereotype—the plantation legend—that described the South as a land of aristocratic planters, beautiful southern belles, poor white trash, faithful household slaves, and superstitious fieldhands. This image of the South received its most popular expression in 1859, in a song called "Dixie," written by a Northerner named Dan Emmett to enliven shows given by a troupe of blackfaced minstrels on the New York stage.

Historians in recent decades have paid much more attention to the enslaved people of the South and the world they made for themselves. To a lesser extent, they have also studied the poor subsistence farmers, known as "yeoman farmers", who owned little property and no slaves.

Politics
The Old South had a vigorous two-party system, with the Whigs being the strongest in towns, in the business community, and in upscale plantation areas. The slightly more numerous Democrats were strongest among common farmers and poor western districts. After the end of Reconstruction in 1877, black Republicans were largely disenfranchised, leaving the Republican Party a small element based mainly in remote mountain districts within the South. The region was now called "the Solid South", where Southern states would mainly vote Democrat, and lasted through the 1964 presidential election.

Religion
Historians have explored the religiosity of the Old South in some detail. Before the American Revolution, the Church of England was established in some areas, especially Virginia and South Carolina. However, the colonists refused to allow any Anglican bishops, and instead established a practicing layman as head of the vestry in each Anglican church, which then allowed for policy determinations as if the parish were a unit of local government. Thus it handled community issues such as welfare, cemeteries, and local infrastructure.

The Church of England was disestablished during the American Revolution under the leadership of people such as Thomas Jefferson and James Madison. The 18th century had the First Great Awakening, while the early 19th century saw the Second Great Awakening make a powerful influence across the region, especially with poor whites but also with black slaves. The result was the establishment of many Methodist and Baptist churches. In the antebellum period, large numbers of open air revivals converted new members and strengthened the resolve of established members. By contrast in the North, revivals sparked a strong interest in abolition of slavery, a forbidden topic South of the Mason-Dixon line. Additionally during the antebellum period, social issues such as public schools and prohibition, which grew rapidly in the North, made little headway in the South. Most Southern church members used their religion for intense group solidarity, which often involved intimate examinations of the sins and failures of their fellow parishioners. At a deeper level, religion served as a temporary relief, with a promised permanent relief from all the hardships and oppressions of this world. Missionary activity was a controversial issue in the South, with strong support for missionaries mostly among the Methodists, while the Baptists vacillated between movements for and against missionary activity.

Honor
Historian Bertram Wyatt-Brown has emphasized how a very strong sense of honor, rooted in European traditions, shaped ethical behavior for men in the Old South. The rigid unwritten code guided family and gender relationships and helped provide a structure for social control. A highly controversial aspect of the honor system was the necessity to fight in duels, under rigidly prescribed conditions, whenever a man's honor was challenged by an equal. If one's honor was challenged by an inferior person, it sufficed to beat him up. Men had the duty of protecting the honor of their women as well. Honor became an important ingredient in differentiating manhood versus effeminacy and patriarchy versus companionate marriage. College authorities strictly forbade violent duels. In response, undergraduates revised the code, dropping the duels, and set up a system whereby fellow students would dictate punishment when misconduct violated college rules or the code of honor. By claiming such control over their college environment, students reshaped the honor code and bridged the awkward gap between dependence and independent adulthood. So many talented people were being killed that anti-dueling associations were organized which challenged the honor code.

Old South Day
Since 1976, the city of Ochlocknee, Georgia has celebrated 'Old South Day' in November each year.

See also
 American gentry
 History of the Southern United States
 Solid South
 South Atlantic States

References

Further reading
 Abernethy, Thomas Perkins The Formative Period in Alabama, 1815-1828 (1922)  online free
 Doddington, David. " "Old Fellows": Age, Identity, and Solidarity in Slave Communities of the Antebellum South." Journal of global slavery 3.3 (2018): 286-312.  online
 Forman, Henry Chandlee. The Architecture Of The Old South The Medieval Style 1585-1850 (1948)   online free
Fox-Genovese, Elizabeth. Within the Plantation Household: Black and White Women of the Old South (1988)   online
 Harris, J. William. The Making of the American South: a Short History, 1500-1877 (2008).
 Hyde, Samuel C. Plain Folk Yeomanry in the Antebellum South (2004).
 Jabour, Anya. Scarlett's Sisters: Young Women in the Old South (2007) online
 Kaye, Anthony E. Joining Places: slave neighborhoods in the Old South (U of North Carolina Press, 2007). online
 McMillen,  Sally G. Southern Women: Black and White in the Old South (2002) online
 Merritt, Keri Leigh. Masterless Men: Poor Whites and Slavery in the Antebellum South (2017)
 Musher, Sharon Ann. "Contesting "The Way the Almighty Wants It": Crafting Memories of Ex-Slaves in the Slave Narrative Collection." American Quarterly 53.1 (2001): 1-31. online
 Phillips, Ulrich Bonnell. Life And Labor In The Old South (1929) online free
 Smith, John David. An Old Creed for the New South: Proslavery Ideology and Historiography, 1865-1918 (Southern Illinois University Press, 2008.
 Smith, Mark M. The Old South (Malden, Mass: Blackwell Publishers, 2001).
 Wertenbaker, Thomas Jefferson. Old South The Founding Of American Civilazation (1942)  online free
 Wyatt-Brown,  Bertram. Honor and Violence in the Old South (1986) online, an abridged version of his famous book, Southern Honor: Ethics and Behavior in the Old South (1982)

External links
 Documenting the American South. A digital publishing initiative that provides numerous documents and information about the South of the United States before and after the American Civil War.
Jekyll Island Club - Victorian Playground of Northern Industrialists in the Old South
Southern Arts Federation

American culture
Culture of the Southern United States
Regions of the Southern United States
Regions of the United States
Western (genre) staples and terminology
Antebellum South